Charles Edward Mark Hansel (12 October 1917 – 28 March 2011) was a British psychologist most notable for his criticism of parapsychological studies.

Early life and education
Hansel was born in 1917 in Bedford, England and attended Bedford School as a child. He received a commission in the RAF Equipment branch as an acting pilot officer in April 1939, serving in England, Iraq, and Egypt. After his service, he attended Bournemouth Municipal College of Technology and Commerce, earning a BA, and Fitzwilliam College, Cambridge University, where he studied Moral Sciences, Part II Psychology and earned his MA.

Parapsychology career
Following his graduation in 1949, Hansel joined the faculty at the University of Manchester as a lecturer in Psychology. He later moved to Swansea University where he became a Professor of Experimental Psychology and Head of the Department of Psychology. Hansel was a fellow of the Committee for Skeptical Inquiry.

Hansel's most well-known work is his book ESP: A Scientific Evaluation (1966), revised (1980, 1989). In it, he examined the areas of telepathy, clairvoyance, precognition, and psychokinesis and analysed a number of major ESP experiments that claimed to have conclusively demonstrated the phenomenon. Hansel found that all of the research he examined suffered from poor experimental design which allowed for error, misinterpretation and fraud.  He suspected that the data from the Soal-Goldney experiments, run by Samuel Soal, was fraudulent but parapsychologists refused to accept Hansel's charge. However, Hansel was later proven to be correct. Hansel noted that there was a history of "trickery" in psychical research and reached the conclusion that although trickery was not necessarily the cause of the results, as long as it could not be ruled out ESP could not be claimed to have been conclusively demonstrated. In his revised edition, Hansel (1980) points out that "after 100 years of research, not a single individual has been found who can demonstrate ESP to the satisfaction of independent investigators. For this reason alone it is unlikely that ESP exists".

Family
Hansel married in 1954 and had five children.

Reception
Hansel's book received positive reviews from scientists and sceptics. The physicist Victor J. Stenger noted that "Hansel succeeded brilliantly in exposing the shoddiness of the experimental procedures of Rhine's laboratory." Robert Sheaffer stated that Hansel's criticisms were devastating to the claims of ESP and the book was a serious challenge to parapsychology. Philosopher Antony Flew also gave a positive review, highlighting the failure of parapsychology to provide repeatable experiments.

The work also received criticism with parapsychologist John Beloff claiming the book was little more than an attempt to explain away the evidence. Parapsychologist Gardner Murphy gave it a mixed-review but recommended the book "as valuable for the parapsychologist in pointing out ways in which he must tighten his research." Hansel's revised edition in 1989 contained further studies and an appendix with replies to his critics.

The psychologist David Marks in his book The Psychology of the Psychic (2000) noted that his discovery of experimental error in parapsychological experiments confirmed the research of Hansel.

Publications
 
 
 
 
 
 
 
 "Psychical History". Nature (August 1968).

References

1917 births
2011 deaths
British psychologists
British sceptics
Critics of parapsychology
People from Bedford
People educated at Bedford School
Alumni of Fitzwilliam College, Cambridge
Alumni of the University of Manchester
Academics of the University of Manchester
Academics of Swansea University
Alumni of Bournemouth University
Military personnel from Bedford
Royal Air Force personnel of World War II
Royal Air Force officers